Qiqihar Sanjiazi Airport  is a dual-use military and civil airport serving the city of Qiqihar, Heilongjiang Province, China.

Airlines and destinations

See also
List of airports in China
List of the busiest airports in China
List of People's Liberation Army Air Force airbases

References

External links

Airports in Heilongjiang
Chinese Air Force bases
Qiqihar
Airports established in 1988